Haram Rud-e Olya Rural District is a rural district (dehestan) in the Central District of Malayer County, Hamadan Province, Iran. At the 2006 census, its population was 8,251, in 2,106 families. The rural district has 18 villages.

References 

Rural Districts of Hamadan Province
Malayer County